In the United States, pre-law (or prelaw) refers to any course of study taken by an undergraduate in preparation for study at a law school.

The American Bar Association requires law schools to admit only students with an accredited Bachelor's Degree or its equivalent depending on the student's country of origin. However, there are no specific "pre-law" degree or majors, and unlike pre-med, an undergraduate student seeking legal education in the United States is not required to take a set of prerequisites in order to apply. Hence, most undergraduate institutions do not offer an official "pre-law" concentration, and in some cases provide somewhat equivalents such as "Law, Society and Justice" instead. Students awarded with Bachelor of Arts, Bachelor of Science or equivalent degrees (and more rarely, higher degrees such as the master's degree and doctorate) may apply for law schools as long as they meet specific admission requirements set forth by individual law schools, as well as the standard requirements (such as character and fitness) as set forth by the ABA and the Law School Admission Council.

In 2001, the five most common majors of students entering law school were political science, history, English, psychology, and criminal justice. The five majors with the highest acceptance rates were physics, philosophy, biology, chemistry, and government service.

A pre-law program is sometimes offered at some American colleges and universities; however, it is considered to be a "track" that follows a certain curriculum.

Common pre-law course

Writing and speaking skills 

Communication studies
English composition
Rhetoric

Problem-solving skills 

Philosophy
Statistics
Economics
Entrepreneurship

Understanding human behavior 

Anthropology
History
Psychology
Sociology

Topics related to law 

Political science
Government
Study on Law

Pre-law students may be advised or required to take upper-level political science and sociology electives, such as legal systems, criminal law, international law, policy, etc. Specific requirements for these courses vary by institution.

Benefits
Benefits to being pre-law or a part of a pre-law society include interaction with lawyers and law professors, gaining a comprehensive grounding in legal studies and concepts, and receiving discounts off LSAT prep courses. In addition, being a part of a pre-law society also allows students to familiarize themselves with the law school application process including the LSAT, letters of recommendation and the personal statement. Pre-law programs encourage students to communicate effectively and think creatively and critically. Furthermore, a pre-law program can also help a student decide whether law school is the right path for them.

References

Legal education in the United States
Undergraduate education in the United States